The Future Starts Here: The Essential Doors Hits is a compilation album by the rock band the Doors. It was released in the U.S. in 2008 to commemorate the band's 40th anniversary and contains new stereo audio mixes of the songs.

Critical reception

In a review for AllMusic, critic Steve Leggett ranked the album at four and a half out of five stars. He described the album as a "concise set [that] hits all the absolute essentials, and each of these 20 tracks is a classic, from the early mission statement 'Break on Through (To the Other Side)' to the unambiguous stomp of 'L.A. Woman'."

Track listing
All tracks are written by the Doors (John Densmore, Robby Krieger, Ray Manzarek, Jim Morrison), except where noted. Other releases may show different information.

Personnel
Per album liner notes:

Jim Morrison – vocals, production
Robby Krieger – guitar, production
Ray Manzarek – piano, organ, production
John Densmore – drums, production
Bruce Botnick – production, remastering
Paul A. Rothchild – production

Certifications

References

2008 greatest hits albums
Albums produced by Paul A. Rothchild
Albums produced by Bruce Botnick
Elektra Records compilation albums
Rhino Records compilation albums
The Doors compilation albums